John Trevor Godfrey (March 28, 1922 – June 12, 1958) was an American fighter pilot and flying ace in the 336th Fighter Squadron, 4th Fighter Group, Eighth Air Force during World War II.

4th Fighter Group

Godfrey achieved 18 air-to-air kills against the Luftwaffe, before he was shot down by flak and captured by the Germans on August 24, 1944.

Godfrey was friend and wingman to Don Gentile. Together with his wingman Dominic Salvatore Gentile, they were known as ‘Captains Courageous’, ‘The Two Man Air Force’, ‘Messerschmitt Killers’, or ‘Damon and Pythias’ 

He was promoted to the rank of major before he was discharged from the Army Air Forces shortly following the war.

Post war
Originally from Woonsocket, Rhode Island, he served in the Rhode Island State Senate.

He died on June 12, 1958 of Amyotrophic lateral sclerosis. His life is told in the 1958 book, The Look of Eagles, written with Thomas D. White.

References

External links
Johnny Godfrey at acesofww2.com
 
4th Fighter Group WWII official association website

1922 births
1958 deaths
American World War II flying aces
Neurological disease deaths in Rhode Island
Deaths from motor neuron disease
People from Woonsocket, Rhode Island
Recipients of the Air Medal
Recipients of the Distinguished Flying Cross (United States)
Recipients of the Silver Star
Shot-down aviators
United States Army officers
United States Army personnel of World War II